The Triplett Company Building is a historic commercial building on 2nd Street in Lewisville, Arkansas.  The two-story brick structure was built c. 1915 by the Triplett Company, a lumber company that flourished during Lewisville's lumber boom.  It is one of a small number of Lafayette County's commercial buildings to survive from that period, and is the best local example of panel brick design.

The building was listed on the National Register of Historic Places in 1996.

See also
National Register of Historic Places listings in Lafayette County, Arkansas

References

Commercial buildings on the National Register of Historic Places in Arkansas
Commercial buildings completed in 1915
Buildings and structures in Lafayette County, Arkansas
National Register of Historic Places in Lafayette County, Arkansas